Åge Spydevold (22 August 1925 – 9 March 1982) was a Norwegian footballer. He played in four matches for the Norway national football team from 1951 to 1959.

References

External links
 

1925 births
1982 deaths
Norwegian footballers
Norway international footballers
Place of birth missing
Association footballers not categorized by position